Juliet Etherington (born 7 June 1979 in Hastings, New Zealand) is a shooting competitor for New Zealand.

At the 2002 Commonwealth Games she won a bronze medal in the 50m Rifle Prone event. At the 2006 Commonwealth Games she won a silver medal in the 50m Rifle Prone and a bronze medal in the 50m Rifle Prone Pairs event partnering Kathryn Mead.

References

Living people
1979 births
Sportspeople from Hastings, New Zealand
New Zealand female sport shooters
ISSF rifle shooters
Commonwealth Games silver medallists for New Zealand
Commonwealth Games bronze medallists for New Zealand
Shooters at the 2002 Commonwealth Games
Shooters at the 2006 Commonwealth Games
Commonwealth Games medallists in shooting
20th-century New Zealand women
21st-century New Zealand women
Medallists at the 2002 Commonwealth Games
Medallists at the 2006 Commonwealth Games